Tamir Muskat (in Hebrew תמיר מוסקט) is an Israeli musician/producer-sound engineer who was born and raised in Petach Tikva, Israel as son of a Romanian immigrant. His father was the manager of Anzeagi Conservatorion for music in Petach Tikva. As a teenager, he was already a prominent rock drummer and percussionist. Early on, Tamir started producing Israel's first thrash metal records in his basement studio but also began working with Sephardic Eastern singers of Greek and Turkish origin in a highly ornamented style that is Middle Eastern in nature.

Tamir moved to the United States in 1995 and joined the band Izabo. In 1996, Tamir joined the internationally acclaimed band Firewater as a drummer and producer. With Firewater, he toured the world and made three albums, two of which he produced. Tamir founded Vibromonk Records with Dan Shatzky, which has become an important music production studio in New York City. Since then Tamir has produced albums with exceptional artists from around the world and has helped create a unique musical palette. As a member of Stephen Ulrich's instrumental trio Big Lazy, he released The Big Apple's Creme de la Crème, called "primeval, lurid, mournful, frantic, pretty, dissonant, stark, lush" by The Village Voice and "elegantly gritty stunningly beautiful music" by The New Yorker. Big Lazy has written music for various films, and toured with The White Stripes, John Spencer Blues Explosion, Reverent Horton Heat, Tom Tom Club and Firewater.

In 2002, Tamir launched an electro/gypsy/punk project called J.U.F., with Ori Kaplan and members of Gogol Bordello. The band created a new music scene in New York City, making remixes for Gypsy labels in Europe and DJing.

The band Balkan Beat Box is a progression of this style of music, taking a worldly approach to the music of their ancestors and evolving it to not only include the region of the world that they emigrated from, but they also to incorporate the musical styles from their parents' and grandparents' birthplaces.

In 2007, Muskat opened Vibromonk East in Tel Aviv, where he produces records for artists from around the globe.

Discography

Asaf Avidan -"Different Pulsess" – producer, musician, engineer, mixer 
Oren Barzilay – "Sorrow demons joy blizzards" – producer, musician, engineer, mixer  
Firewater – "The Golden Hour" – producer, musician, engineer, mixer 
Hava Alberstain – "Ech etslecha" – producer, musician, engineer, mixer 
Balkan Beat Box – band member
Give  
Blue Eyed Black Boy 
Nu Med
J.U.F – "Gogol Bordello VS Tamir Muskat" – band member
Alaev Family and Tamir Muskat – producer, musician, engineer, mixer 
Big Lazy – 3 albums – Band member / Producer

References

External links 
http://www.Ape-Records.com/
http://www.balkanbeatbox.com/
Vibromonk Records
Techno Fusion from Balkan Beat Box Interview
http://www.jpost.com/ArtsAndCulture/Arts/Article.aspx?id=285694

Living people
People from Tel Aviv
Israeli people of Romanian-Jewish descent
Israeli emigrants to the United States
Firewater (band) members
Gypsy punk
Year of birth missing (living people)